Bebearia sophus, the Sophus forester, is a butterfly in the family Nymphalidae. It is found in Senegal, Guinea-Bissau, Guinea, Sierra Leone, Liberia, Ivory Coast, Ghana, Togo, Benin, Nigeria, Cameroon, the Democratic Republic of the Congo, Uganda, Rwanda, Kenya, Tanzania and possibly Gabon, the Republic of the Congo, the Central African Republic and Angola. The habitat consists of low to montane forests.

Adults are attracted to fallen fruit.

The larvae feed on Landolphia and Chrysophyllum species.

Subspecies
B. s. sophus (Guinea: Conakry, Sierra Leone, Liberia, Ivory Coast, Ghana, Togo, Benin, Nigeria, Cameroon, Gabon, Congo, Central African Republic, Angola, Democratic Republic of the Congo)
B. s. aruunda (Overlaet, 1955) (Democratic Republic of the Congo: Mayumbe, Ubangi, Mongala, Uele, north Kivu, Tshopo, Equateur, Cataractes, Kwilu, Kasai, Sankuru, Lomami, Lualaba and Tanganika)
B. s. audeoudi (Riley, 1936) (Uganda, western Kenya, north-western Tanzania)
B. s. monforti Hecq, 1990 (Rwanda)
B. s. ochreata (Carcasson, 1961) (western Tanzania)
B. s. phreone (Feisthamel, 1850) (Senegal, Guinea-Bissau, Guinea)

References

Butterflies described in 1793
sophus
Taxa named by Johan Christian Fabricius